Charles P. Henderson (March 3, 1911 – September 15, 1990) was a Republican Ohio politician who served as mayor of Youngstown, Ohio in 1948–54.  In 1953, he was appointed by President Dwight D. Eisenhower as a member of the Commission on Intergovernmental Relations.

References

Mayors of Youngstown, Ohio
1911 births
1990 deaths
Ohio Republicans
20th-century American politicians